Evas Kill is a river in Fulton and Montgomery counties in the state of New York. It flows into the Mohawk River in Cranesville. Evas Kill flows through Cranes Hollow.

Fishing
Suckers can be speared and taken from the section of the creek within Montgomery County from January 1 to May 15, each year.

References 

Rivers of Montgomery County, New York
Mohawk River
Rivers of New York (state)
Rivers of Fulton County, New York
Rivers of Saratoga County, New York